Lysergic acid, also known as -lysergic acid and (+)-lysergic acid, is a precursor for a wide range of ergoline alkaloids that are produced by the ergot fungus and found in the seeds of Turbina corymbosa (ololiuhqui), Argyreia nervosa (Hawaiian baby woodrose), and Ipomoea tricolor (morning glories, tlitliltzin). 

Amides of lysergic acid, lysergamides, are widely used as pharmaceuticals and as psychedelic drugs (LSD). Lysergic acid is listed as a Table I precursor under the United Nations Convention Against Illicit Traffic in Narcotic Drugs and Psychotropic Substances.

Lysergic acid received its name as it was a product of the lysis of various ergot alkaloids.

Total synthesis
Lysergic acid is generally produced by hydrolysis of natural lysergamides, but can also be synthesized in the laboratory by a complex total synthesis, for example by Robert Burns Woodward's team in 1956. An enantioselective total synthesis based on a palladium-catalyzed domino cyclization reaction has been described in 2011 by Fujii and Ohno. Lysergic acid monohydrate crystallizes in very thin hexagonal leaflets when recrystallized from water. Lysergic acid monohydrate, when dried (140 °C at ) forms anhydrous lysergic acid.

The biosynthetic route is based on the alkylation of the amino acid tryptophan with dimethylallyl diphosphate (isoprene derived from 3R-mevalonic acid) giving 4-dimethylallyl--tryptophan which is N-methylated with S-adenosyl--methionine. Oxidative ring closure followed by decarboxylation, reduction, cyclization, oxidation, and allylic isomerization yields -(+)-lysergic acid.

Isomers
Lysergic acid is a chiral compound with two stereocenters. The isomer with inverted configuration at  carbon atom 8 close to the carboxyl group is called isolysergic acid. Inversion at carbon 5 close to the nitrogen atom leads to -lysergic acid and -isolysergic acid, respectively.

See also
 Ergine
 Lysergamides

References

Carboxylic acids
Ergolines
Tryptamines
Total synthesis